Karl Heinrich Christian Bartels (25 September 1822 in Meilsdorf – 20 June 1878 in Kiel) was a German internist and pathologist, known for research of kidney disorders.

He studied medicine and sciences at the universities of Kiel and Heidelberg, where he was influenced by the work of anatomist Jacob Henle. He served under surgeon Louis Stromeyer in the First Schleswig War, during which, he spent two months in Danish captivity. In 1851 he obtained his habilitation and worked as assistant to Friedrich Theodor von Frerichs at the University of Kiel. From 1853 he spent several months in Vienna, where he studied pathological anatomy and skin diseases. In 1859 he was named a professor of pathology and director of the clinic for medical pathology at Kiel.

Selected works 
 De conjugatae verae pelvis introitus mensuris et mensurationibus (dissertation), 1850.
 Klinische Studien über die verschiedenen Formen von chronischen diffusen Nierenentzündungen, 1870 – Clinical studies on the various forms of chronic diffuse kidney infections. 
 Handbuch der Krankheiten des Harnapparates, 1875 – Handbook of diseases of the urinary system (considered to be his best work).

References 

1822 births
1878 deaths
University of Kiel alumni
Heidelberg University alumni
Academic staff of the University of Kiel
German pathologists
German nephrologists
People from Stormarn (district)